The 1991 Soul Train Music Awards aired live on March 12, 1991 (and was later syndicated in other areas), honoring the best in R&B, soul, rap, jazz, and gospel music from the previous year. The show was held at the Shrine Auditorium in Los Angeles, California and was hosted by Patti LaBelle, Luther Vandross and Dionne Warwick.

Special awards

Heritage Award for Career Achievement
 Smokey Robinson

Sammy Davis Jr. Award for Entertainer of the Year
 M.C. Hammer

Winners and nominees
Winners are in bold text.

Best R&B/Urban Contemporary Album of the Year – Male
 Johnny Gill – Johnny Gill
 Al B. Sure! – Private Times...and the Whole 9!
 MC Hammer – Please Hammer Don't Hurt 'Em
 Keith Sweat – I'll Give All My Love to You

Best R&B/Urban Contemporary Album of the Year – Female
 Mariah Carey – Mariah Carey
 Anita Baker – Compositions
 Michel'le – Michel'le
 Lisa Stansfield – Affection

Best R&B/Urban Contemporary Album of the Year – Group, Band, or Duo
 Bell Biv Devoe – Poison
 En Vogue – Born to Sing
 Tony! Toni! Toné! – The Revival
 The Whispers – More of the Night

Best R&B/Urban Contemporary Single – Male
 Johnny Gill – "My, My, My"
 Babyface – "Whip Appeal"
 MC Hammer – "U Can't Touch This"
 James Ingram – "I Don't Have the Heart"

Best R&B/Urban Contemporary Single – Female
 Mariah Carey – "Vision of Love"
 Anita Baker – "Talk to Me"
 Janet Jackson – "Alright"
 Lisa Stansfield – "All Around the World"

Best R&B/Urban Contemporary Single – Group, Band or Duo
 En Vogue – "Hold On"
 After 7 – "Ready or Not"
 Bell Biv DeVoe – "Poison"
 Quincy Jones  – "The Secret Garden (Sweet Seduction Suite)"

Best R&B/Urban Contemporary Song of the Year
 MC Hammer – "U Can't Touch This"
 Mariah Carey – "Vision of Love"
 En Vogue – "Hold On"
 Johnny Gill – "My, My, My"

Best Music Video
 Janet Jackson – "Alright"
 En Vogue – "Hold On"
 MC Hammer – "U Can't Touch This"
 Public Enemy – "911 Is a Joke"

Best R&B/Urban Contemporary New Artist
 Mariah Carey
 Oleta Adams
 En Vogue
 Vanilla Ice

Best Rap Album
 MC Hammer – Please Hammer Don't Hurt 'Em
 Ice Cube – Amerikkka's Most Wanted
 LL Cool J – Mama Said Knock You Out
 Public Enemy – Fear of a Black Planet

Best Gospel Album
 The Winans – Return
 Commissioned – State of Mind
 Tramaine Hawkins – Live
 Take 6 – So Much to Say

Best Jazz Album
 Najee – Tokyo Blue
 Anita Baker – Compositions
 Branford Marsalis Quartet and Terence Blanchard – Music from Mo Better Blues
 Take 6 – So Much to Say

Performers
 Johnny Gill – "Rub You the Right Way"
 Ralph Tresvant – "Sensitivity"
 Bell Biv DeVoe – "She's Dope!"
 En Vogue – "Hold On"
 LL Cool J – "Around the Way Girl"
 Smokey Robinson Tribute:
 Luther Vandross – "Since I Lost My Baby"
 Patti LaBelle – "Baby, Baby"
 Gladys Knight – "The Tracks of My Tears"
 MC Hammer – Medley: "Let's Get It Started" / "Turn This Mutha Out" / "Here Comes the Hammer"
 Najee
 Teddy Pendergrass
 Dionne Warwick

References

Soul Train Music Awards, 1991
Soul Train Music Awards
Soul
Soul
1991 in Los Angeles